Brunelle is a French surname. Notable people with the surname include:

Francis Brunelle (born 1949), French Neuroradiologist, pediatric radiologist and political figure in France
Hervé-Edgar Brunelle (1891–1950), Canadian politician and lawyer
Honoré Brunelle Tourigny (1857–1918), surveyor, engineer and political figure in Quebec
Liina Brunelle (born 1978), French-Russian actress
Lucas Brunelle, videographer for bicycle events and a bicycle advocate
Paul Brunelle (1923–1994), singer-songwriter and country guitarist of western Quebec
Paule Brunelle (born 1953), Canadian politician
Philip Brunelle, American conductor, choral scholar and organist
Pierre Brunelle (born 1991), French engineer and entrepreneur
René Brunelle (1920–2010), Ontario political figure

See also
 Brunelles, a commune in the Eure-et-Loir department in northern France

French-language surnames